Wolves is a Canadian psychological thriller film, directed by Danny Dunlop and released in 2022. The film stars Mark Nocent as an unnamed lonely and directionless young man who becomes obsessed with trying to solve a series of killings and dismemberings of animals, after learning on the news that police psychological profilers have identified the likely perpetrator as somebody uncomfortably similar to himself.

The cast also includes Jake Raymond, Allan Dobrescu, Hugh Wilson, Rod Keith, Chad Andrews, Nate Oppel, Franklin Davis Jr., Holt McCallany, Lawrene Denkers, Monika Meyer, Joyce Powell, Ballo Harideen, Nathaniel Keith, Eric Schmidt, Sarah Green, Rick Guzman and Maysee McLean.

The film was inspired by a real-life series of unsolved animal deaths in Dunlop's hometown of London, Ontario, in the late 2010s, which was identified as a public emergency due to the risk that recurring animal killings of this type are sometimes a precursor to the perpetrator becoming a serial killer of humans.

The film premiered April 1, 2022 as part of the Cinequest Film & Creativity Festival's virtual Cinejoy lineup, and was later screened as part of the festival's live in-theatre program in August. It had its Canadian premiere in August at the Regina International Film Festival.

Critical response
Alex Saveliev of Film Threat positively reviewed the film, praising Nocent's performance and writing that "Dunlop – who also wrote, edited, produced, shot, and co-wrote the score – is a true force of nature. He favors a contemplative mood, with static and slowly panning shots, gently luring the viewer into his twisted world. The filmmaker introduces several disorienting jump-cuts to the mix to reflect the protagonist’s disheveled state of mind. Everything in Wolves is immersed in monochrome gray, tar-black, and eggshell-white. From the gorgeous opening shot of a person jogging down by a river, streetlights reflected on its dark surface, to the final, restaurant-set sequence, Dunlop creates an atmosphere of unease and subliminal tension."

Brian Fanelli of Horror Buzz was more mixed, writing that "This feature is certainly an interesting character study, though, at times, it plods along a little too slowly. It feels like it takes the recluse a long time to finally crack the case. The rest of the film features the protagonist sitting alone in his apartment, staring at his laptop, or driving around late at night, checking out one seedy back alley after another. There are times when these sequences grow a little tiresome. That said, overall, the feature toys with some interesting concepts and Dunlop really makes excellent use of setting to reinforce the sense of isolation. The apartment feels so sparse, while the chilly exterior shots reinforce the coldness that exists within the recluse’s life, underscoring his desperation for some type of connection, especially a girlfriend."

Awards
The film was nominated for the John Dunning Best First Feature Award at the 11th Canadian Screen Awards in 2023.

References

External links

2022 films
2022 thriller films
Canadian psychological thriller films
2020s English-language films
2020s Canadian films
English-language Canadian films